Rambo: The Force of Freedom (also known simply as Rambo) is a 1986 American animated series based on the character of John Rambo from David Morrell's book First Blood and the subsequent films First Blood (1982) and Rambo: First Blood Part II (1985). This series was adapted for television by story editor/head writer Michael Chain and also spawned a toy line.

The series ran for 65 episodes and was produced by Ruby-Spears Enterprises. It debuted on April 14, 1986 as a five-part miniseries and was renewed in September as a daily cartoon.

Production
The series cost more than $15 million.

Plot

On Colonel Trautman's request, John Rambo leads a special unit called "The Force of Freedom" against General Warhawk's paramilitary terrorist organization S.A.V.A.G.E. (Specialist-Administrators of Vengeance, Anarchy and Global Extortion) all over the globe.

Characters

Force of Freedom
The Force of Freedom is a team that goes around the world fighting the forces of S.A.V.A.G.E. Among the members of the Force of Freedom are:

 John Rambo (voiced by Neil Ross) - The main protagonist of the series. He leads the Force of Freedom in fighting S.A.V.A.G.E. when called in by Colonel Samuel Trautman. When not on missions, Rambo would either be shown tending to an animal or helping kids with their survival training.
 Colonel Samuel "Sam" Trautman (voiced by Alan Oppenheimer) - He serves as the group's commanding officer. He would often call in Rambo during his break time. Colonel Trautman would sometimes accompany Rambo on his missions.
 Edward "Turbo" Hayes (voiced by James Avery) - An African-American mechanical engineer and race car driver. According to his toy bio, Turbo is also a First Lieutenant who graduated from the US Air Force Academy.
 Katherine Anne "K.A.T." Taylor (voiced by Mona Marshall) - An Asian-American military woman who was a master of disguises, gymnastics, and martial arts alike. K.A.T. seemed to have a crush on Rambo. She is based on Co-Bao from Rambo: First Blood Part II.
 White Dragon (voiced by Robert Ito) - A heroic ninja who is Black Dragon's twin brother. According to his toy bio, White Dragon had also developed a ninja training program for the U.S. military forces.
 T.D. "Touchdown" Jackson (voiced by George DiCenzo) - A former football player and ally of Rambo. He joined the Force of Freedom at the time when Mad Dog's gang forces elderly couples out of their homes as part of General Warhawk's plot to dig into a military base and steal a top secret new supertank in "Blockbuster".
 Chief (voiced by Alan Oppenheimer) - A Native American ally of Rambo. He joined the Force of Freedom after he rescued his friends in the swamp and from S.A.V.A.G.E. following the plane crash and helped prevent General Warhawk from burying the gold in the sacred grounds on Spirit Island (where the graves of Chief's forefathers are located) in "Skyjacked Gold".

S.A.V.A.G.E.
S.A.V.A.G.E. stands for Specialist-Administrators of Vengeance, Anarchy and Global Extortion. Their goal of world domination leads them into conflict with the Force of Freedom, especially Rambo. In addition to a substantial number of soldiers, among the members of S.A.V.A.G.E. are:

 General Warhawk (voiced by Michael Ansara) - The leader of S.A.V.A.G.E. wearing reflective sunglasses who serves as the primary villain of the series. General Warhawk was previously a European army captain (possibly West Germany) who was convicted of selling state secrets and deported for his coup. He then organized and built S.A.V.A.G.E. General Warhawk is based on Lt. Col. Pudovsky from Rambo: First Blood Part II and his charisma is based on Adolf Hitler.
 Sergeant Havoc (voiced by Peter Cullen) - General Warhawk's second-in-command and top enforcer. He has strength that rivals Rambo's strength. Sergeant Havoc was previously a drill sergeant for the free world. After being court-martialed for spying, he joined up with S.A.V.A.G.E. His physique is based on the physique of Sgt. Yushin from Rambo: First Blood Part II.
 Gripper (voiced by Lennie Weinrib) - A European mercenary and member of S.A.V.A.G.E with a metal right hand (hence the name) that wears an eyepatch. He was a former member of the French Foreign Legion until he was dismissed after failing to recognize the surrender flag and joined S.A.V.A.G.E.
 Nomad (voiced by Edmund Gilbert) - A burnoose-wearing Middle-Eastern member of S.A.V.A.G.E. He was a wandering nomadic warrior that calls no country his home. Nomad leads a group of outcasts which consists of cutthroats and thieves.
 Mad Dog (voiced by Frank Welker) - The leader of an unnamed biker gang and member of S.A.V.A.G.E. who sports a mohawk and a S.A.V.A.G.E. logo tattoo on his chest. He is first called Spike in the episode "Battlefield Bronx," but renamed Mad Dog in all subsequent episodes. According to his toy bio, Mad Dog was found unfit for military services and has an extended criminal record for theft, reckless driving, and arson.
 Animal (voiced by Frank Welker) - Member of Mad Dog's biker gang.
 Jerkface (voiced by Lennie Weinrib) - Member of Mad Dog's biker gang.
 Razor (voiced by Peter Cullen) - Member of Mad Dog's biker gang.
 Black Dragon (voiced by Robert Ito) - A rogue ninja who is the twin brother of White Dragon. He is known as the greatest assassin that ever lived. Black Dragon would sell his service to any group that would pay his fee with his recurring clients being S.A.V.A.G.E. He sometimes has other ninjas under his command when assisting S.A.V.A.G.E. in some of their plots. Black Dragon's ultimate goal is to kill White Dragon. Primarily, he also considers Rambo as a worthy opponent.
 Snakebite (voiced by Stanley Ralph Ross) - A member of S.A.V.A.G.E. who was born and raised in the Okeefenokee Swamp and likes wild animals like venomous snakes, insects, and black rats which he carries in his Beast Pack.
 Dr. Hyde (voiced by Edmund Gilbert) - A cybernetic mad scientist and member of S.A.V.A.G.E. whose head is in a dome-shaped helmet. According to General Warhawk in the episode "Robot Raid", he and X-Ray were thought to be long dead, but became mad geniuses.
 X-Ray (voiced by James Avery) - Dr. Hyde's cybernetic henchman. Along with Dr. Hyde, he was also thought to be long dead and became a mad genius in his own right.
 Max (voiced by Lennie Weinrib) - Dr. Hyde's android henchman and enforcer who was created by Dr. Hyde and X-Ray.

There were also some one-shot characters who were members of S.A.V.A.G.E. that appeared in one episode where a few of them appeared more than once. The following are listed in order of appearance:

 Admiral Nomak (voiced by Lennie Weinrib) - An admiral who assisted General Warhawk twice. First, he helped General Warhawk in "Raise the Yamato" in a plot to raise the Yamato Battleship in order to take over Tierra Libre. He then appears in "Pirate Peril" along with Captain Scar assisting General Warhawk in a plot to raise the French submarine Liberte off the coast of Hong Kong.
 Count (voiced by Alan Oppenheimer) - A descendant of Vlad III the Impaler who worked with General Warhawk on two occasions. The first time was when it involved capturing Nobel Prize–winning physicist Herbert Kengsington in "Deadly Keep." The second time was when he helped General Warhawk in a plot to capture the President of the United States in "Return of the Count."
 Rama (voiced by Dale Ishimoto) - The leader of the Cult of the Cobra. He only appeared in "Cult of the Cobra" where he and his group helped General Warhawk in halting the food shipments to the Indian Province of Assam in a plot to force the people of Assam to make General Warhawk their dictator.
 Pandora (voiced by Mona Marshall) - A female panther trainer working for General Warhawk. She only appears in "Raid on Las Vegas" where she assisted in a plot to rob the Las Vegas casinos.
 Sheik Hassat (voiced by Lennie Weinrib) - A sheik who assisted General Warhawk in a plot to blow up the shipping businesses on the Suez Canal.
 Mike Flynn (voiced by Alan Oppenheimer) - An old friend of Rambo's who ended up stealing the XK-7 fighter jet and used it to assist General Warhawk in enslaving the Zimboli people to mine diamonds for him.
 Varinia (voiced by Mona Marshall) - A female operative of S.A.V.A.G.E. Only appearing in "Fire in the Sky", she assisted General Warhawk, Sergeant Havoc, Gripper, and Nomad in stealing a nuclear-armed submarine called the USS Typhoon and plans to auction it to any terrorist that is interested in it.
 Captain Scar (voiced by Peter Cullen) - A pirate captain who assisted General Warhawk and Admiral Nomak in a plot to raise the French submarine Liberte off the coast of Hong Kong.
 Mephisto (voiced by Frank Welker) - A magician who assisted General Warhawk in a plot to steal the Washington Monument.
 Mombo Igthayan (voiced by Mona Marshall) - A Haitian Voodoo magician who assisted General Warhawk in a plot to enslave the Haitians and mine the island.
 Dr. Blackburn (voiced by Peter Cullen) - A scientist who assisted General Warhawk in a plot to use a mind-control box on a killer whale named Korac and attack the NORAD Bases.
 Iron Mask (voiced by Peter Cullen) - A criminal in an iron mask who assisted General Warhawk in a plot to locate an old war plane containing a fortune of gold. Later, he was revealed by Rambo to be the crooked Major Murphy who took over a military base in Munich during the Oktoberfest.

Episodes

Miniseries

Regular series

Cast and crew

Principal cast
 Neil Ross - John Rambo
 Michael Ansara - General Warhawk
 James Avery - Edward "Turbo" Hayes, X-Ray
 Peter Cullen - Sergeant Havoc, Razor, Captain Scar (in "Pirate Peril"), Dr. Blackburn (in "Terror Beneath the Sea"), Uncle George (in "Horror in the Highlands")
 George DiCenzo - T.D. Jackson
 Edmund Gilbert - Nomad, Dr. Hyde, President Ramón ("Tierra Libre" miniseries), Major Gómez (in "The Taking of Tierra Libre")
 Robert Ito - Black Dragon, White Dragon, Dr. David Taylor (in "The Halley Microbe")
 Mona Marshall - Katherine "Kat" Taylor, Estrella ("Tierra Libre" miniseries), Pandora (in "Raid on Las Vegas"), Varinia (in "Fire in the Sky"), Mombo Igthayan (in "Night of the Voodoo Moon")
 Alan Oppenheimer - Colonel Samuel Trautman, Chief, Count (in "Deadly Keep," "Return of the Count"), Mike Flynn (in "The Doomsday Machine")
 Lennie Weinrib - Gripper, Jerkface, Max, Admiral Nomak (in "Raise the Yamato," "Pirate Peril"), Sheik Hassat (in "Guns over the Suez"), General Stedring (in "Mephisto's Magic," "Alphas, Arms and Ambush")
 Frank Welker - Mad Dog, Animal, Mephisto (in "Mephisto's Magic"), Supertrooper (in "Supertrooper")

Additional voices
 Michael Bell - General Ranjid (in "The Lost City of Acra")
 Dale Ishimoto - Rama (in "Cult of the Cobra"), Major Sing (in "Cult of the Cobra")
 Russi Taylor - Bobby (in "Exercise in Terror"), Teacher (in "Exercise in Terror)
 Susan Blu - Stacy (in "Blind Luck"; uncredited)
 Phil Clarke - Professor Ivanovich (in "Quarterback Sneak"; uncredited)
 Dick Gautier - Tommy (in "Quarterback Sneak"; uncredited), Premier Motoff (in "Quarterback Sneak"; uncredited)
 Dana Hill - Johnny (in "Just Say No"; uncredited)
 Keye Luke - President Wang (in "Vote of Terror"; uncredited)
 Robert Ridgely - Alpha Leader (in "Alphas, Arms and Ambush"; uncredited)
 Stanley Ralph Ross - Snakebite (uncredited), Dr. Monk (in "Mirage"; uncredited)
 John Stephenson - Doctor (in "Crash"; uncredited)
 Janet Waldo - Danny (in "Return of the Count"; uncredited), Cathy (in "Return of the Count"; uncredited)

Crew
 Jack Bornoff - Assistant Story Editor
 Michael Chain - Head Writer
 Michael Hack - Voice Director
 David Morrell - Creator, Writer

Music
Jerry Goldsmith's scores for First Blood and Rambo: First Blood Part II were licensed for use in the series and tracked throughout (mostly from Rambo: First Blood Part II), with his music for the film's trailer for Rambo: First Blood Part II, used as the opening and closing themes. It was supplemented by original music composed by Haim Saban and Shuki Levy, who received an "additional music by" credit.

Release

Home media 
Lionsgate Home Entertainment (which also owns the DVD rights to the Rambo films) has released the entire series on DVD in Region 1 in 6 volume sets.

Reception

Controversy
Rambo: The Force of Freedom was the first animated series to be adapted from an R-rated film series.

Fictional countries and back-stories are featured, some of them echoing historical or current events. In order to meet Federal Communications Commission decency standards and make the series viewable for children, the violence level was significantly reduced compared to the films.

The cartoon generated a mild controversy at the production studio, with writers wondering how they could present a child-friendly main character who was created as a troubled Vietnam War veteran suffering from posttraumatic stress disorder (PTSD). While some have alleged that the show used child psychologists who recommended that the cartoon not make any references to Vietnam, POWs, or Rambo's experiences in 1982's First Blood and 1985's Rambo: First Blood Part II, the show's head writer, Michael Chain, denies this and instead states that his previous experience in producing children's programming led him to make sure that Rambo would not "have an adverse effect on the psyche of children". Sylvester Stallone was annoyed and embarrassed that the Rambo character was used as a cartoon character.

Other media

Toys
A Rambo action figure line was produced Coleco as a tie-in to the animated series.
The first series released in 1986 consisted of eleven 6.25" figures (including two Rambo figures), plus a few playsets and vehicles. The second series, released in 1987, consisted of seven additional figures and a few more playsets, was only partially released in the United States.

Books
There have been literature based on Rambo: The Force of Freedom and book adaptations of select episodes from the series. A book and tape set adapting the original five-part episode miniseries titled Rambo: The Rescue was published by Kid Stuff Records in 1987. Another full series of five book and tape sets were published by Rainbow Communications Ltd. from 1985 to 1986, as part of its "Rainbow Theatre" product line; the four books adapted the episodes "Guns Over the Suez", "The Lost City of Arca", "Pirates Peril" and "Alphas, Arms and Ambush".

Two more book series were published in the United Kingdom through World Distributors from 1986 to 1987; the "Little Owl Superstars" series consisted of four installments "The Wolves of Daemon", "Nightstrike", "Sea of Flames" and "The Mask of Mardar" while the "Mini World" line also ran for four stories "Operation Suicide", "Sergeant Havoc's Challenge", "Skyjack" and "Curse of Karmoun". Two annuals, one for 1987 and another for 1988, a mini coloring book and an activity book round the World Distributors product range.

Four volumes of coloring and activity books also based on the series were published by Modern Publishing in 1986.

References

External links
 
 
 
 

1980s American animated television series
1986 American television series debuts
1986 American television series endings
American children's animated action television series
American children's animated adventure television series
Animation controversies in television
Television controversies in the United States
English-language television shows
First-run syndicated television programs in the United States
Orbis Communications
Rambo (franchise)
Animated television shows based on films
Television series based on adaptations
Animation based on real people
Cultural depictions of Sylvester Stallone
Television series by Ruby-Spears
Television series by CBS Studios
Television series by Universal Television